Lampua or Lampuwa is a village in tehsil Shri Madhopur of Sikar district in Rajasthan, India. It is situated 8 km west of Ringas, on the Ringas-Khatu Road.

Demography 
The population of the village is about 550 families. Out of those families, Bajiya is the only Jat gotras with population of 450 families. Other castes dwelling in the village (with number of families) are Harijan (50), Meenas (30), Nai (20), Bawriya (2), Brahman (1), Bania (1) came in 1938 named Phool chand Gupta.

References 

Villages in Sikar district